Rafael Durán Martínez (born 20 August 1997) is a Mexican professional footballer who plays as an attacking midfielder for Liga de Expansión MX team Pumas Tabasco, on loan from UNAM.

Club career

Tigres UANL
Durán would make his professional debut during an Apertura 2017 Copa MX group stage match against Cruz Azul, coming in as a substitute at the 61st minute. The game tied 1–1. He would score his first goal with Tigres on 21 October 2018 in a league match against Club Universidad Nacional, scoring turning the score in favor of Tigres 2–1 but eventually tying 3–3.

Honours
Tigres UANL
Campeones Cup: 2018

References

External links
 
 

1997 births
Living people
Mexican footballers
Association football midfielders
Tigres UANL footballers
Footballers from Guadalajara, Jalisco